Rebecca D'Agostino (born 15 October 1982) is a Maltese football defender currently playing for Mosta FC in the Maltese First Division. She has captained the Maltese national team since its creation in 2003, and she scored its first goal that same year and its first winner goal in 2011.

References

1982 births
Living people
Maltese women's footballers
Malta women's international footballers
Women's association football defenders